Spyke is a 4-issue comic-book limited series created by Mike Baron (writer) and Bill Reinhold (penciller), and published in 1993 by the Marvel Comics imprint Epic Comics. Marie Javins was the editor for the series.

References 

Marvel Comics limited series
1993 comics debuts
Epic Comics titles